Evan Hammond (born 1980 in Flin Flon, Manitoba) is a Canadian morning radio show host, hockey play-by-play broadcaster, and blogger. He is the morning show host at 93.3 The Peak in Port Alberni, British Columbia, and the radio play-by-play voice of the Alberni Valley Bulldogs of the British Columbia Hockey League.

External links
 Evan Hammond
 http://www.alberni.ca/news/alberni-valley%E2%80%99s-evan-hammond-named-team-1040bchl-broadcaster-year
 http://www.bclocalnews.com/vancouver_island_central/albernivalleynews/news/40310093.html
 https://web.archive.org/web/20090628065328/http://933thepeak.com/pages/1101519.php

1980 births
Canadian radio personalities
People from Flin Flon
Living people